Vinod Bhayana is an Indian politician who is the MLA of the Hansi constituency in the Hisar District in Harayana, India. He won reelection in 2019 by 22,200 votes.

In his previous term, Bhayana served as Chief Parliamentary Secretary in the Haryana Government under Jails, Order and Law, and Electricity portfolios.

Political career
Bhayana started his political career in Lohari Ragho, where he was elected Sarpanch five times. His father, Bhai Mahesh Chandar Bhayana, was also Sarpanch there. Vinod Bhayana was elected as MLA from Hansi in 2009 and reelected in 2019.

Family
In 1984, Bhayana married Sunita Bhayana. The couple have two sons and one daughter: Anshul Bhayana, Sahil Bhayana and Supriya Nagpal. They live in Hansi.

References 

Indian National Congress politicians
Haryana Janhit Congress politicians
Living people
Year of birth missing (living people)
Haryana MLAs 2019–2024
Bharatiya Janata Party politicians from Haryana